Zhao Tingting (born 28 November 1982) is a Chinese badminton player from Nantong, Jiangsu.

Career
A doubles specialist, Zhao has often been a "utility player" on China's national team, winning international tournaments with a variety of compatriots who typically partner someone else. She has won women's doubles at the Denmark (2002, 2004) and Thailand (2003) Opens with Wei Yili; the French (2002), China (2008), and Hong Kong (2008) Opens with Zhang Yawen; the Swiss Open (2007) and Asian Championships (2007) with Yang Wei; and at the China Open (2007) with Gao Ling. She has also captured mixed doubles titles at the Thailand (2003) and Denmark (2004) Opens with Chen Qiqiu, and at the Hong Kong Open (2006) with Zheng Bo.

Zhao was a women's doubles silver medalist with Wei Yili at the 2003 IBF World Championships in Birmingham, England, dropping the final to compatriots Gao Ling and Huang Sui, and a mixed doubles bronze medalist with Chen Qiqiu at the same tournament. At the 2004 Olympics in Athens she just missed a medal by finishing fourth in women's doubles with Wei Yili and losing in the quarterfinals of mixed doubles with Chen Qiqiu. Zhao was not selected to compete in the 2008 Beijing Olympics, a victim of China's great depth in women's badminton and rules that limit the number of Olympic entries from any one country. However, 2009 proved to be her most successful year as Zhao won both the prestigious All-England and BWF World Championships in women's doubles with Zhang Yawen. With these achievements, she reportedly retired from the Chinese team at the end of the 2009 season.

Achievements

BWF World Championships 
Women's doubles

Mixed doubles

World Cup 
Women's doubles

Mixed doubles

Asian Championships 
Women's doubles

Mixed doubles

World Junior Championships 
Girls' doubles

Asian Junior Championships 
Girls' doubles

BWF Superseries 
The BWF Superseries, launched on 14 December 2006 and implemented in 2007, is a series of elite badminton tournaments, sanctioned by Badminton World Federation (BWF). BWF Superseries has two level such as Superseries and Superseries Premier. A season of Superseries features twelve tournaments around the world, which introduced since 2011, with successful players invited to the Superseries Finals held at the year end.

Women's doubles

 BWF Superseries Finals tournament
 BWF Superseries Premier tournament
 BWF Superseries tournament

BWF Grand Prix 
The BWF Grand Prix has two levels, the Grand Prix Gold and Grand Prix. It is a series of badminton tournaments, sanctioned by the Badminton World Federation (BWF) since 2007. The World Badminton Grand Prix has been sanctioned by the International Badminton Federation since 1983.

Women's doubles

Mixed doubles

 BWF Grand Prix Gold tournament
 BWF & IBF Grand Prix tournament

IBF International 
Women's doubles

Mixed doubles

References

External links 
 
 
 
 

1982 births
Living people
Sportspeople from Nantong
Badminton players from Jiangsu
Chinese female badminton players
Badminton players at the 2004 Summer Olympics
Olympic badminton players of China
World No. 1 badminton players